Events from the year 1732 in Denmark.

Incumbents
 Monarch – Christian VI
 Prime minister – Iver Rosenkrantz

Events
 27 June  Cron Printz Christian arrives back in Copenhagen from the first Danish expedition to Canton with a valuable cargo of tea, silk and other Chinese products.
 
 11 December —  The wedding of Crown Prince Frederik and Princess Louise
 11 December – Crown Prince Frederik and Princess Louise are received in Copenahgen and the wedding ceremony is repeated.

Undated
 The County of Løvenholm is established by Frederik Christian Danneskiold-Samsøe from the manors of af Løvenholm, Demstrup and Sødringholm.

Births
 17 January – Daniel Adzer, medallist (died 1808) 
 1 October – Jørgen Balthazar Winterfeldt, naval officer and philanthropist (died 1821)

Full date missing
 Johanne Seizberg, illustrator and teacher (died 1772)

Deaths
 26 August – Hans Nobel, landowner and civil servant (born 1657)

References

 
1730s in Denmark
Denmark
Years of the 18th century in Denmark